The following is a list of coaches who have coached the Collingwood Football Club at a game of Australian rules football in the Australian Football League (AFL), formerly the VFL.

 Statistics are correct as of the end of round 21 of the 2022 AFL season.

Key: 
 C = Coached
 W = Won
 L = Lost
 D = Drew
 W% = Win percentage

Notes
1: Bob Rush stood in to perform the match day coaching duties in the 1930 Grand Final, including delivering the half time address, because regular coach Jock McHale was absent on the day of the game, having fallen ill with influenza days before the game. For many years, Rush was credited with having coached the game; but after a decision in 2014 by the AFL's historians, McHale is now credited as Collingwood's sole coach in the game for the purposes of coaching statistics.
2: Although Neil Mann's coaching span is listed as being from 1972 to 1974 he coached the Magpies once in 1960 and again for a game in 1967 as caretaker coach.

References
AFL Tables List of Collingwood coaches

Collingwood Football Club
Collingwood Football Club coaches